The 2006 Wakefield Metropolitan District Council election took place on 4 May 2006 to elect members of Wakefield Metropolitan District Council in West Yorkshire, England. One third of the council was up for election and the Labour party kept overall control of the council.

After the election, the composition of the council was
Labour 41
Conservative 14
Independent 5
Liberal Democrat 3

Campaign
Before the election Labour had 44 seats, the Conservatives 10, independents 6 and the Liberal Democrats 3 seats. 75 candidates stood in the election for the 21 seats that were being contested, with Labour very unlikely to lose control of the council, which was the only council in West Yorkshire they still had a majority on.

Election result
The results saw the Conservatives gain 4 seats, 3 from Labour and 1 from an independent. Labour were defeated in Horbury and South Ossett, Pontefract South and Wrenthorpe and Outwood West wards, with the losses blamed by the Labour leader on national issues. The other Conservative gain came in Wakefield South where they defeated independent councillor Norman Hazell by 17 votes. Hazell was a former Conservative member who had left the party in 2001 to sit as an independent councillor. However the other independent member managed to hold his seat in Featherstone despite a strong challenge from Labour.

Ward results

References

2006 English local elections
2006
2000s in West Yorkshire